Mississagi Island is an island in the North Channel of Lake Huron in Algoma District, Ontario, Canada, about  south of the mouth of the Mississagi River and  southwest of the community of Blind River. A rocky ledge extending from North Point forms the north end, while Dog Point is the northeastern tip. The island is forested, and has two small ponds. There was a lighthouse on the island from 1884 until 1948 when it burned down.

References

Lake islands of Ontario
Landforms of Algoma District
Islands of Lake Huron in Ontario